Persatuan Sepakbola Kerinci (simply known as PS Kerinci) is an Indonesian football club based in Kerinci Regency, Jambi. They currently compete in the Liga 3.

Honour 
 Runner-up Gubernur Cup 2020

Supporter
Supporter of PS Kerinci is Kerinci Fans Club.

Mascot
Mascot of PS Kerinci is Andalas Rabbit (Sumatran striped rabbit), because
Mount Kerinci is habitat of Andalas Rabbit. The philosophy of Rabbit is: agility, alert, caution, self-protection.

References

Football clubs in Indonesia
Football clubs in Jambi